A number of steamships were named Bowes Castle, including

, a cargo ship sunk in September 1914
, a cargo ship in service 1920–32

Ship names